Louis-Marie may refer to:

Louis Marie Baptiste Atthalin (1784–1856), French Army officer, politician, painter, watercolorist, and lithographer
Louis-Marie-Augustin d'Aumont, 4th Duke of Aumont of the Aumont family, a French noble house
Louis-Marie Autissier (1772–1830), French-born Belgian portrait miniature painter
Louis-Marie Baader (1828–1920), French painter of German descent
Louis-Marie-Edmond Blanquart de Bailleul (1795–1868), French Roman Catholic bishop
Louis-Marie-Raphaël Barbier (1792–1852), physician and surgeon from Berthier-en-Haut in Lower Canada
Louis-Marie Baudouin (1765–1835), French Roman Catholic priest, founder of the Sons of Mary Immaculate and the Ursulines of Jesus
Louis-Marie-Joseph Beaumont (1753–1828), farmer and political figure in Lower Canada
Louis-Marie Billé (1938–2002), French clergyman, archbishop of Lyon, cardinal until his death in office
Louis-Marie de Blignières (born 1949), French traditionalist Catholic priest, founder of the Fraternity of Saint Vincent Ferrer
Louis Marie-Auguste Boutan (1859–1934), French biologist and photographer
Louis Marie Joseph de Brigode (1776–1827), French politician under the First French Empire and the Bourbon Restoration
Louis Marie Joseph Caffarelli (1760–1845), French sailor, soldier and politician, Conseiller d'État and maritime prefect of Brest
Louis-Marie de Castelbajac, French designer and entrepreneur
Louis-Marie Hilaire Bernigaud de Chardonnet (1839–1924), French engineer and industrialist, inventor of artificial silk
Louis Marie Florent du Châtelet (1727–1793), aristocratic French Army general and diplomat of the Ancien Régime
Louis Marie Cordonnier (1854–1940), French architect associated principally with Lille and the French Flanders region
Louis Marie de la Haye, Vicomte de Cormenin (1788–1868), French jurist and political pamphleteer
Louis Marie Pantaleon Costa, Marquis de Beau-Regard (1806–1864), French statesman, archaeologist, historian and ornithologist
Louis Marie Anne Couperus (1863–1923), Dutch novelist and poet
Louis Marie Bernard Dangeard (1898–1987), French geologist and oceanographer
Louis Marie Alphonse Depuiset (1822–1886), French entomologist who specialised in Lepidoptera
Louis-Marie Désiré-Lucas (1869–1949), French painter
Louis Marie Olivier Duchesne (1843–1922), French priest, philologist, teacher and a critical historian
Louis Marie Raymond Durand (1786–1837), French diplomat, consul in Warsaw during the November Uprising
Louis-Marie-Joseph Maximilian Caffarelli du Falga (1756–1799), French commander and scholar
Louis Marie Fontan (1801–1839), a French man of letters
Louis-Marie Stanislas Fréron (1754–1802), French politician, journalist, representative to the National Assembly
Louis Marie de Lescure, marquis de Lescure (1766–1793), French soldier and opponent of the French Revolution
Louis-Marie Ling Mangkhanekhoun I.V.D. (born 1944), Laotian prelate of the Roman Catholic Church
Louis-Marie Michon (1802–1866), French surgeon
Louis-Marie-François Tardy de Montravel (1811–1864), French admiral, explorer and colonial administrator
Louis Marie de Milet de Mureau (1756–1825), French politician
Louis Marie Jacques Amalric, Comte de Narbonne-Lara (1755–1813), French nobleman, soldier and diplomat
Louis Marie Antoine, vicomte de Noailles (1756–1804), member of the famous Noailles family of the French aristocracy
Louis-Marie Aubert du Petit-Thouars (1758–1831), French botanist studying orchids from Madagascar, Mauritius and Réunion
Louis-Marie Pilet (1815–1877), 19th-century French cellist
Louis Marie Alexis Pothuau (1815–1882), French naval officer and politician
Louis-Marie Pouka, Cameroonian poet who advocated the assimilation of Cameroonian peoples into French culture
Louis-Marie Prudhomme, (1752–1830), French journalist and historian
Louis Marie Quicherat (1799–1884), French Latinist best known for his Latin Dictionary
Louis Marie, Duke of Rambouillet (1746–1749), French prince who died before his fourth birthday
Louis-Marie Régis CC OP MSRC (1903–1988), Canadian philosopher, medievalist, and Dominican priest
Louis Marie de La Révellière-Lépeaux (1753–1824), deputy to the National Convention during the French Revolution
Louis Marie Charles Hurault de Sorbée (born 1786), French soldier
Louis Marie Turreau (1756–1816), French general officer of the French Revolutionary Wars
Louis Marie Julien Viaud or Pierre Loti (1850–1923), French naval officer and novelist, known for his exotic novels and short stories

See also
Jean Louis Marie Eugène Durieu (1800–1874), early French amateur nude photographer
Eugène Louis-Marie Jancourt (1815–1901), French bassoonist, composer, and pedagogue
Claude Louis Marie Henri Navier (1785–1836), French engineer and physicist who specialized in mechanics
Jean Louis Marie Poiret (1755–1834), French clergyman, botanist and explorer
Jean Louis Marie Poiseuille (1797–1869), French physicist and physiologist
Alfred-Armand-Louis-Marie Velpeau (1795–1867), French anatomist and surgeon
Louise-Marie